Fulke Lovell (or Fulk Lovel; died 1285) was a medieval Bishop of London-elect.

Lovell held the prebends of Islington and Caddington Major in the diocese of London before he became Archdeacon of Colchester between 1263 and 1267. He was elected bishop on 18 February 1280 but resigned the election before 8 April 1280. He died on 21 November 1285 while holding the office of archdeacon.

Citations

References
 
 

Bishops of London
Archdeacons of Colchester
1285 deaths
Year of birth unknown
13th-century English Roman Catholic bishops